Shiv Narayan Singh Chauhan, a politician, presently State General Secretary, All India Forward Bloc, Uttar Pradesh

References

External links
 https://web.archive.org/web/20110821085912/http://www.forwardbloc.org/www/Central%20Committee.htm

All India Forward Bloc politicians
Living people
People from Pilibhit
1950 births